Sharyn Bow (born 16 October 1971) is an Australian former cricket player. Bow played eleven One Day Internationals for the Australia national women's cricket team. Bow was a member of the Australian cricket team at the 1993 Women's Cricket World Cup.

References

External links
 Sharyn Bow at southernstars.org.au

Living people
1971 births
Australian women cricketers
New South Wales Breakers cricketers
Queensland Fire cricketers